Cecilia Vennersten is the debut studio album by Swedish pop singer Cecilia Vennersten. It was released in 1995. At the album charts, it peaked number 9 in Sweden and number two in Norway, selling platinum in both countries. The album contains songs such as the Melodifestivalen 1995 hit "Det vackraste" and "Sjunde himlen finns", a Swedish language version of "Show Me Heaven" by Maria McKee. It also contains "Lämnad i mörkret", a Swedish language version of "Left in the Dark" written by Jim Steinman.

Track listing 
 "Det vackraste" (Maria Rådsten, Nanne Grönvall, Peter Grönvall) 3:20
 "Innerst i själen" (Lars Børke, Ole Paus, Örjan Englund) 4:35
 "Hornen i pannan" (Nanne Grönvall) 3:24
 "Kapten Nemo" (Erik Holmberg, Krister Linder) 5:10
 "Skogens Rå" (Maria Rådsten, Nanne Grönvall, Peter Grönvall) 5:00
 "Sjunde himlen finns" (Eric Rackin, Jay Rifkin, Maria McKee; Swedish lyrics by Nanne Grönvall) 3:56
 "Mitt andra jag" (Andrea Weiss-Siguera, Frank Peterson, Matthias Meissner, Thomas Schwartz) 4:11
 "Du är min religion" (Jane Child; Swedish lyrics by Nanne Grönvall) 5:19
 "Tiden" - (Don Black, Simon Climie; Swedish lyrics by Nanne Grönvall) 4:17
 "Lämnad i mörkret" - (Jim Steinman; Swedish lyrics by Nanne Grönvall) 6:46

Charts

References

External links

1995 debut albums
Cecilia Vennersten albums
Swedish-language albums